Kim Hyung-Pil  (born 13 January 1987) is a South Korean footballer who plays for Gyeongnam FC in the K League Challenge.

External links 

1987 births
Living people
South Korean footballers
Jeonnam Dragons players
Busan IPark players
Gyeongnam FC players
Hwaseong FC players
K League 1 players
K League 2 players
K3 League players
Association football forwards